Mashud Wisnusaputra Stadium is a football stadium in Kuningan, Indonesia.

History
The stadium is named after a famous local army intelligence officer Mashud Wisnusaputra.

Other uses
Persita use this stadium for their 2013 Indonesia Super League home games. They play here, since there is a ban for them to play on their own Benteng Stadium. Local team Pesik Kuningan also use this stadium as their home base.

The stadium complex also have a basketball court, tennis court, volleyball court and athletic track lanes. It also has accommodation housing for athletes.

References

External links
 

Football venues in Indonesia
Buildings and structures in West Java